George C. Edwards III is University Distinguished Professor of Political Science and Jordan Chair in Presidential Studies Emeritus at Texas A&M University and distinguished fellow at the University of Oxford. He is a leading scholar of American politics, particularly of the American presidency, authoring or editing 28 books and approximately 100 articles and essays.

Biography

Edwards was born in Rochester, New York, in 1947 and moved with his family to Florida in 1959. He received his B.A. from Stetson University (1969) and his M.A. (1970) and Ph.D. (1973) from the University of Wisconsin–Madison. He also has an M.A. from the University of Oxford.

Academic career
He taught at Tulane University from 1973 to 1978 before moving to Texas A&M University in 1978.
He was the founder and from 1991 to 2001 the director of The Center for Presidential Studies. From 1998 until 2022 he was editor of Presidential Studies Quarterly. He is also general editor of the Oxford Handbook of American Politics. He is currently University Distinguished Professor and Jordan Chair in Presidential Studies Emeritus at Texas A&M University and Distinguished Fellow at the University of Oxford.

Edwards has held a number of visiting appointments, including:
 2017, Warden's Visitor, Nuffield College, University of Oxford
 2012-13, John Winant Professor of American Government and professorial fellow, Balliol College, University of Oxford
 2009, Fellow, Nuffield College, University of Oxford
 2008, Chercheur Invité, Sciences Po, Paris
 2005-06, Olin Professor of American Government and professorial fellow, Nuffield College, University of Oxford
 2002-03, John Adams Fellow, School of Advanced Studies, University of London
 1997, Professor of political science, Hebrew University of Jerusalem
 1993, Professor of political science, Peking University, Beijing
 1985-88, Professor of social sciences, U.S. Military Academy, West Point
 
He has advised Brazil on its constitution and the operation of its presidency, Russia on building a democratic national party system, Mexico on elections, and Chinese scholars on democracy. He also wrote studies for the 1988, 2000, 2008, 2016, and 2020 U.S. presidential transitions and was instrumental in bringing the George Bush Presidential Library and Museum to Texas A&M University’s campus.

Scholarly focus
Edwards's principal focus has been the American presidency. This work has focused on several themes. First, He pioneered the quantitative study of the presidency with Presidential Influence in Congress, the first quantitative study of the presidency  and has edited three volumes on theory and methods of researching the presidency: The Oxford Handbook of the American Presidency; Researching the Presidency; and Studying the Presidency.

His second focus has been presidential leadership in Congress. He has written that presidents are highly dependent on the strategic position in which they find themselves and can only influence Congress at the margins.
Edwards has also written widely on the president’s relations with the public,  particularly their efforts to lead public opinion. He has reported that presidents are rarely able to move the public in their direction. Despite all their efforts, their words typically fall on deaf ears.

In recent years, he has fashioned his empirical findings into a theory of presidential leadership that challenges the view that presidential power is the power to persuade. Instead, he argues, presidential power is the power to recognize and exploit opportunities. In other words, presidents cannot create opportunities for change and must understand and take advantage of whatever possibilities for change already exist. In early 2009, he predicted the problems President Barack Obama would face, despite the declarations of many insiders the new president would transform the political landscape and thus pave the way for major changes in policy. He confirmed these predictions in two books. In 2016, he predicted that despite his reputed promotional and negotiating skills, Donald Trump would not succeed in persuading either the public or Congress to follow his lead, which his subsequent research confirmed.

He has  also written on  reforming the Electoral College and has written and spoken widely on the subject. He also was among the first authors to devote attention to implementing public policy, especially the president's role as chief executive. Most recently, Edwards tackled the area of decision making, arguing that presidents and other top officials often make disastrous decisions because they are prisoners of faulty premises.

Major works
 Prisoners of Their Premises: How Unexamined Assumptions Lead to War and Other Policy Debacles (Chicago, 2022).
 Changing Their Minds? Donald Trump and Presidential Leadership (Chicago, 2021).
 Predicting the Presidency: The Potential of Persuasive Leadership (Princeton, 2016). 
 Overreach: Leadership in the Obama Presidency  (Princeton, 2012).
 Why the Electoral College Is Bad for America, 3rd ed. (Yale, 2019).
 The Strategic President: Persuasion and Opportunity in Presidential Leadership (Princeton, 2009).
 The Oxford Handbook of the American Presidency  (Oxford, 2009), co-editor.
 Governing by Campaigning: The Politics of the Bush Presidency, 2nd ed. (Longman, 2007).
 On Deaf Ears: The Limits of the Bully Pulpit  (Yale, 2003).
 Researching the Presidency   (Pittsburgh, 1993).
 Presidential Approval  (Johns Hopkins, 1990).
 At the Margins: Presidential Leadership of Congress  (Yale, 1989).
 Implementing Public Policy  (Congressional Quarterly Press, 1980).

References

External links
 Home Page   
 Ezra Klein, “The Unpersuaded,” New Yorker, March 19, 2012.
 
 NPR Interview on the George W. Bush Presidency, January 7, 2009: 
 Lecture on the Electoral College on C-Span, 21 Sept. 2004.

1947 births
American male writers
Fellows of Nuffield College, Oxford
Living people
Stetson University alumni
Texas A&M University faculty
Tulane University faculty
University of Wisconsin–Madison alumni
Writers from Rochester, New York